Ceylon is an unincorporated community in Greene County, in the U.S. state of Pennsylvania.

History
A post office called Ceylon was established in 1868, and remained in operation until it was discontinued in 1917. The community was named after the island of Ceylon.

References

Unincorporated communities in Greene County, Pennsylvania
Unincorporated communities in Pennsylvania